The Church of the Holy Archangels is a former 14th-century Serbian Orthodox church in Gornje Nerodimlje near the city of Uroševac, Kosovo. It is listed as a Cultural Monument of Exceptional Importance of the Republic of Serbia. It was destroyed by Albanians during the Kosovo War.

Description
The church was built in the 14th century and restored in 1700. It had a single nave with a narthex. The western façade had two rectangular windows. The façades and the porches were whitened by lime. Under the 18th-century frescoes, there were several paintings from the 14th and 15th centuries. The building also hosted icons from the 17th and 18th centuries. The Pine of Tsar Dušan, a black pine tree planted by Emperor Dušan, was located near the church.

See also 
 Cultural monuments of the Kosovo district

References

14th-century Serbian Orthodox church buildings
14th-century establishments in Serbia
Serbian Orthodox church buildings in Kosovo
Cultural Monuments of Great Importance (Serbia)
Cultural heritage monuments in Ferizaj District
Destroyed churches in Kosovo
Persecution of Serbs